The East End is a part of the Adelaide central business district, in the north-east corner of the Adelaide city centre. This area is a popular office and retail district and has an increasing residential interest from the building of high-density luxury apartments in the area.

The retail centre of the East End is Rundle Street. Although the area is not officially demarcated, its approximate boundaries are North Terrace, East Terrace, Pulteney Street and Flinders Street. It is also sometimes stated as including parts of Kent Town and parklands locations such as the Adelaide Botanic Gardens, Rymill Park and the National Wine Centre of Australia. Other major streets are Frome Street, Grenfell Street and Pirie Street.

The area is bounded by parklands on the north and east sides, with the west side being mostly bounded by Hindmarsh Square.

Apartment Development
The eastern end of Rundle Street was the site of Adelaide's original fruit and vegetable wholesale markets. These closed in the 1980s and, after a long and controversial decision making process involving some government money, the Garden East (or East End Astoria) apartment development was built. This was the start of a growing number of prestige apartment buildings in the area.

Events
The East End is a popular spot in Adelaide for large events. These include:
The Adelaide Fringe
The preliminary stage (stage 0) of the Tour Down Under. Called the Jacob's Creek Down Under Classic, stage 0 it is a street circuit bicycle race around the four sides of Rymill Park
The cross country stage of the Adelaide Horse Trials runs through the parklands and is free entry to all. This is normally the Saturday of the November event.
Being part of the Adelaide Street Circuit currently used for the Adelaide 500.

References

Further reading

Adelaide